Dean is a civil parish in the Borough of Allerdale in Cumbria, England.  It contains 37 listed buildings that are recorded in the National Heritage List for England.  Of these, two are listed at Grade I, the highest of the three grades, two are at Grade II*, the middle grade, and the others are at Grade II, the lowest grade.  The parish contains the villages of Dean, Deanscales, Pardshaw, Branthwaite, Ullock, and Eaglesfield, and the surrounding countryside.  The oldest listed building is a churchyard cross, with its medieval base.  The most important buildings from a heritage point of view are a church and a tower house, both of which are listed at Grade I.  Most of the other listed buildings are houses and associated structures, or farmhouses and farm buildings.  The other listed buildings include structures associated with the Friends, a war memorial, and a former packhorse bridge.


Key

Buildings

References

Citations

Sources

Lists of listed buildings in Cumbria